British Expeditionary Force (BEF) may refer to:

 British Expeditionary Force (World War I), the British field force sent to France in World War I
 British Expeditionary Force (World War II), the British field force sent to France in World War II